Phaeoura mexicanaria is a species of moth of the family Geometridae first described by Augustus Radcliffe Grote in 1883. It is found in North America, including British Columbia, California, Texas and Washington.

The wingspan is 40–50 mm.

The larvae feed on Pinus species.

References

Moths described in 1883
Ennominae